Welser is a surname. Notable people with the surname include:

Bartholomeus V. Welser (c. 1475 – 1559), Augsburg merchant and banker
Bartholomeus VI. Welser (1512 – 1546), explorer of Venezuela
Carl Wilhelm Welser von Neunhof (1663 – 1711), mayor of Nuremberg
Franz Welser-Möst (born 1960), Austrian conductor, music director of the Cleveland Orchestra
Mark Welser (1558 – 1614), German banker, politician, and astronomer
Philippine Welser (1527 – 1580), morganatic wife of Ferdinand II, Archduke of Austria

Welser family, a German banking and merchant family.

German-language surnames